The Leaota Mountains are located in central Romania, north of the city Târgovişte. They are part of the Southern Carpathians group of the Carpathian Mountains, and have as neighbours the Bucegi Mountains to the east and Piatra Craiului to the west.

The 2,133 meters high pyramidal Leaota peak raises in a superb land of dense fir forests, wild animals, few wanderer shepherds, and almost no tourists.

Leaota tourist shelter (Romanian cabana)
The shelter was built in the 1940s at an altitude of 1.330 meters above sea level.  It is currently abandoned, being used sporadically by passing tourists. In 1962 the chalet had running water, electricity generator, permanent buffet and ski slopes arranged nearby. Until 2004, the chalet of the same name operated on the Brateiului valley, but now it is no longer included in the tourist circuit.

Gallery

External links
 Information about the Carpathians Mountains

References

Mountain ranges of Romania
Mountain ranges of the Southern Carpathians